Breeders is a 1986 science fiction horror film directed by Tim Kincaid, and stars Teresa Farley, Lance Lewman and Frances Raines.

A remake was released in 1997 under both the same title and Deadly Instincts.

Plot

When five Manhattan women, all virgins, are accosted under mysterious circumstances, the police think they have got a twisted serial rapist on their hands. But as NYPD Detective Dale Androtti (Lance Lewman) and Dr. Gamble Pace (Teresa Farley) soon discover, the reality is much worse. Tracing the source of the attacks underground, they find an unstoppable alien presence that has infested an abandoned subway system and begun to reproduce itself by impregnating human women.

Cast 
 Teresa Yvon Farley as Dr. Gamble Pace
 Lance Lewman as Detective Dale Andriotti
 Frances Raines as Karinsa Marshall
 Natalie O'Connell as Donna
 Amy Brentano as Gail
 LeeAnne Baker as Kathleen
 Matt Mitler as Ted

Release

The film was given a limited release theatrically in the United States by Empire Pictures in May 1986.  It was subsequently released on VHS by Wizard Video.

The film was officially released on DVD by MGM in 2001.

Reception
Critical reception for the film has been negative.
TV Guide panned the film, criticizing the film's acting, dialogue, and effects.
Valeriy Kolyadych from PopMatters gave the film 2/10 stars, calling it "unashamedly exploitative" and criticized the film's acting, dialogue, and finale.

References

External links
 
 
 
 

1986 horror films
1980s science fiction horror films
1986 films
Films set in Manhattan
American science fiction horror films
Empire International Pictures films
1980s English-language films
Alien invasions in films
American erotic horror films
1980s American films